The 2017 Houston Dynamo season is the club's 12th season of existence since joining Major League Soccer for the 2006 season. The club's main objective is to qualify to the MLS Cup Playoffs after missing the postseason the last three consecutive seasons.

It is the team's first year under the leadership of Head Coach Wilmer Cabrera and third season under General Manager Matt Jordan. On the front office end, it is Gabriel Brener's second season as majority owner and Chris Canetti's seventh as the President of the club.

Month by month review

Preseason

Five days after the end of the 2016 regular season, the Houston Dynamo appointed Wilmer Cabrera as the fourth head coach in club history. Cabrera was promoted from the club's lower league affiliate Rio Grande Valley FC Toros where served as the head coach for the 2015 USL season.

Cabrera took over for interim head coach Wade Barrett – the only other reported candidate for the job – and a team that had missed the MLS Cup Playoffs for the third consecutive season. The Dynamo job is the Colombian tactician's second head coaching responsibility in Major League Soccer and one that reunites him with Erick "Cubo" Torres, a former pupil of Cabrera's at the defunct Chivas USA.

March
The Houston Dynamo opened the season at home with a 2–1 victory over the defending MLS Cup Champion Seattle Sounders FC, on a night when  Erick Torres and Romell Quioto scored their first goals for the club.  Torres and Quioto would score in a second consecutive match the following week, coupled with Alberth Elis' first goal in a Dynamo shirt, as the team collected  3–1 win over Columbus Crew SC.

The 2–0–0 start was the third time the club began the season with two wins and a Portland Timbers with the same record set up for an early season matchup between top three teams. Torres and Quioto scored in Portland to give the Dynamo a 2–1 lead at halftime, becoming the seventh and eight players in club history to score in three consecutive matches. However, three unanswered goals in the second half by the Timbers would end in the Dynamo's first loss of the season.

Position in the MLS Western Conference at the end of March

April
The Dynamo began the month of April with a 4–1 win over the New York Red Bulls, a match where Erick Torres scored his first hat-trick with the club. Dylan Remick scored the equalizer in the 14th minute against the Red Bulls, becoming the first non-forward to score in 2017.

The second weekend in April, the team traveled to the New England Revolution in search of their first point on the road. The Dynamo lost 2–0, dropping to 0–2–0 away, as homegrown Memo Rodriguez made his MLS debut. Goalkeeper Tyler Deric would be benched after his performance against the Revs, giving Joe Willis his first start of the season.

Houston and Minnesota United FC faced off for the first time ever in Major League Soccer as the expansion side took a point in Space City. The Dynamo led  at the half thanks to Mauro Manotas and Elis before the Loons would score two of their own to draw. Needing to respond after winning only one of their previous four matches, the Dynamo outlasted the visiting San Jose Earthquakes 2–0 in a nationally televised afternoon game on UniMás.

The Dynamo traveled to Toronto FC for their first midweek match of the season that ended in a 2–0 loss at the feet of a Jozy Altidore brace. The team recorded two wins, two losses and a draw and a goal differential of +1 in the month of April.

Position in the MLS Western Conference at the end of April

May
The Houston Dynamo would begin another month with a blowout at home, this time collecting the second shutout of the season in a 4–0 win against Orlando City SC. Manotas scored a brace against Orlando as Elis and Quioto each found the back of the net once more. After missing the game versus Orlando due to concussion protocol, Torres returned to the starting lineup and scored the game-winning goal against Vancouver Whitecaps FC.

The road woes would continue, however, as the Dynamo only collected a point as they played three consecutive away matches in the span of 12 days. The Dynamo lost 2–0 at Philadelphia Union, lost 4–1 at Atlanta United FC and played to a scoreless draw at FC Dallas. Tyler Deric returned to the starting lineup in the Texas Derby match, ending Willis' run of seven straight matches in goal.

The Dynamo would end the month with their fourth match in 15 days, keeping their home record free of losses after a 5–1 win over Real Salt Lake. The five goals matched the club record for goals in a game and give the club a +4 goal differential for the month of May.

Position in the MLS Western Conference at the end of May

June
After managing to pick up their first point on the road a week before, the Dynamo lost yet another game on the road as they fell 1–0 to the Seattle Sounders. This time the damage came from a familiar face, the club's second all-time scorer Will Bruin. The team took a few days off as they did not have a match the following week due to a FIFA international break.

The Dynamo entered the 2017 edition of the U.S. Open Cup in the fourth round against North Carolina FC. Given that this match was on the east coast and the team had a league match on the west coast a few days later, Wilmer Cabrera featured a majority of young players in the 3–2 extra time win over NCFC. Memo Rodriguez scored the game winner, his first with the Dynamo, to help the team advance to the round of 16. Three days later, the team almost picked up their first win on the road before a Romain Alessandrini goal drew the LA Galaxy level in the closing moments of the match.

Two rivalry matches would end the month for the Dynamo, the first being another draw with FC Dallas. In this latest instance, Torres and Maximiliano Urruti traded goals to end the match 1–1 in the second Texas Derby match of the season. A reserve-heavy Dynamo would then lose 2–0 to a Sporting Kansas City side that featured many of their regulars, bowing out of the U.S. Open Cup.

Position in the MLS Western Conference at the end of June

July
The Dynamo started the month of July on opposite ends of a 3–1 scoreline. They lost their seventh match on the road at the Colorado Rapids, a match in which they went into the half tied at one-a-piece. The team then dismantled a Piatti-less Montreal Impact at home, heading into a two-week break in league play due to the 2017 CONCACAF Gold Cup group stage.

August
The Dynamo had an up-and-down August, that was ultimately cut short by Hurricane Harvey. They opened the month with a scoreless draw away against  Real Salt Lake. The Dynamo, led by a goal and assist from Vicente Sanchez, then crushed the San Jose Earthquakes at home. A 2-1 loss away to Vancouver and an exciting 3-3 draw in Dallas rounded out the month. With the third draw of the season in Dallas, the Dynamo solidified their hold over El Capitan.

September
The Post-Harvey blues were very much real for the Houston Dynamo, as they opened September with their first home loss of the season. A 1-0 defeat to the Colorado Rapids, who had been win-less away from home previously. Another 1-0 loss followed, this time at San Jose. The Dynamo got their first points of the month in a 1-1 draw against NYCFC, in a strange game that was hosted in Connecticut. The Dynamo closed the month with an exciting, yet disappointing 3-3 draw at home against the LA Galaxy. This draw continued the team's strange inability to gain points from teams at the bottom of the Western Conference. The Dynamo finished the month on a high note with an important 2-1 home victory over Minnesota United. Vicente Sanchez continued to showcase his value to the team throughout the month, despite his age as he racked up 4 assists during the month. New DP Tomás Martínez also started to settle in with the team, as he scored his first goal of the season against the Galaxy.

October
October proved to be a great month for the Men in Orange. A big 2-1 win at home against Sporting KC, followed by a gutsy 0-0 draw at Sporting clinched the first Houston Dynamo playoff appearance since 2013. The Dynamo finished off their regular season with a big 3-0 win over the Chicago Fire. That win, along with a Kansas City loss clinched 4th place in the West for the Dynamo. Right Back A.J. DeLagarza tore his ACL in the early minutes of the game, a crucial knock on the Dynamo's playoff hopes.

The Dynamo took on Sporting Kansas City in the Knockout Round of the 2017 MLS Playoffs, the third match between the team in four games. The Dynamo would win that game 1-0 off an Alberth Elis goal in Extra Time and advanced to play the Portland Timbers in the Conference Semifinals. The first leg was a dire 0-0 draw, with neither team threatening much. While the Dynamo had an all-around great October, one of their players had a much more rocky month. GK Tyler Deric won MLS Player of the Month honors on October 27, but was also arrested on assault charges. Deric would miss the remaining games in the Dynamo's season.

Current squad

Coaching staff

Goal scorers
As of match played October 22, 2017

Assists
As of match played October 22, 2017

Disciplinary record
As of match played October 22, 2017

References

Houston Dynamo FC seasons
Houston Dynamo
Houston Dynamo
Houston Dyamo